Jacobus Adriaan 'Attie' Strauss  (born 2 September 1959) is a former South African rugby union player.

Playing career
Strauss finished his schooling at Boland Agricultural High School in Paarl and then joined the South African Correctional Services in Pretoria. He played for the Northern Transvaal under–20, under–25 and B–teams. He also played for the Northern Free State under–20 team and in 1983 he joined the rugby club of Stellenbosch University. In his first match for Maties he formed the front row with Hempies du Toit and Shaun Povey, both Springboks. Strauss made his senior provincial debut for Western Province in 1983.

He made his test debut for the Springboks against the visiting South American Jaguars team on 20 October 1984 at Loftus Versveld in Pretoria.

Test history

See also
List of South Africa national rugby union players – Springbok no. 539

References

1959 births
Living people
South African rugby union players
South Africa international rugby union players
People from Hantam Local Municipality
Rugby union players from the Northern Cape
Rugby union props
Western Province (rugby union) players